The United Arab Emirates national under-19 cricket team represent the country of United Arab Emirates in under-19 international cricket.

The UAE has qualified for the Under-19 Cricket World Cup on three occasions – 2014 (as host), 2020 and 2022. Additionally, the team has regularly qualified for the Under-19 Asia Cup as one of the leading ICC associate members in Asia.

History
The UAE became an affiliate member of the International Cricket Council (ICC) in 1989 and an associate member the following year.

The UAE qualified for the 2014 ICC Under-19 Cricket World Cup as hosts, which was also the first time it had hosted a global cricket event.

In April 2019, the team won the Asia Division 1 tournament to qualify for the 2020 Under-19 Cricket World Cup for the second time. The team coach for the 2020 Under-19 Cricket World Cup was South African Dominic Telo, assisted by UAE senior team captain Ahmed Raza. In the tournament warm-up matches, UAE caused a stir by registering an upset victory over New Zealand.

Former Pakistan international Mudassar Nazar served as national under-19 coach for the 2021 ACC Under-19 Asia Cup and the 2022 Under-19 Cricket World Cup.

At the 2022 World Cup, the UAE recorded an upset victory against the hosts West Indies, winning by 82 runs in the 9th-place play-off semi-final.

Under-19 World Cup record

Records
All records listed are for under-19 One Day International (ODI) matches only.

Team records

Highest totals
 284/7 (50 overs), v. , at Basseterre, 15 January 2022
 249 (49 overs), v. , at Potchefstroom, 28 January 2020
 232/2 (38.4 overs), v. , at Bloemfontein, 18 January 2020
 224/9 (50 overs), v. , at Port-of-Spain, 28 January 2022
 205 (47.5 overs), v. , at Sharjah, 18 February 2014

Lowest totals
 102 (33 overs), v. , at Abu Dhabi, 14 February 2014
 105 (32.4 overs), v. , at Abu Dhabi, 22 January 2020
 121/9 (50 overs), v. , at Dubai, 27 February 2014
 140 (49.2 overs), v. , at Abu Dhabi, 25 February 2014
 148 (48.1 overs), v. , at Basseterre, 22 January 2022

Individual records

Most career runs
 240 – Alishan Sharafu (2020-2022)
 197 – Jonathan Figy (2020)
 175 – Punya Mehra (2022)
 173 – Vriitya Aravind (2020)
 150 – Ali Naseer (2020-2022)

Highest individual scores
 102* (101 balls) – Jonathan Figy, v. , at Bloemfontein, 18 January 2020
 93 (121 balls) – Aayan Afzal Khan, v. , at Port-of-Spain, 29 January 2022
 81 (68 balls) – Osama Hassan, v. , at Potchefstroom, 28 January 2020
 73 (50 balls) – Ali Naseer, v. , at Basseterre, 15 January 2022
 72 (78 balls) – Punya Mehra, v. , at Basseterre, 15 January 2022

Most career wickets
 12 – Aryan Lakra (2020)
 10 – Pankaj Prakash (2014), Jash Giyanani (2022)
 8 – Moaaz Qazi (2014), Adhitya Shetty (2022), Dhruv Parashar (2022)

Best bowling performances
 4/24 (10 overs) – Omer Mohammed, v. , at Abu Dhabi, 23 February 2014
 4/29 (10 overs) – Adhitya Shetty, v. , at Port-of-Spain, 25 January 2022
 4/30 (9 overs) – Dhruv Parashar, v. , at Port-of-Spain, 29 January 2022
 4/35 (10 overs) – Rishabh Mukherjee, v. , at Potchefstroom, 30 January 2020
 3/20 (10 overs) – Aryan Lakra, v. , at Potchefstroom, 30 January 2020

References

Under-19 cricket teams
United Arab Emirates in international cricket